Moyock  is an unincorporated community and census-designated place (CDP) in Currituck County, North Carolina, United States. As of the 2010 census it had a population of 3,759.

Geography
Moyock is located on North Carolina Highway 168 just south of the Virginia state line. Because of this, Moyock has begun to witness an increase in residential development as an emerging commuter town for the Hampton Roads region. NC 168 leads southeast  to Currituck, the county seat.

Driving distances
Areas north of the N.C. state line are a short to medium distance away. Moyock is the closest of all North Carolina locales to the following places:

This is the closest distance that North Carolina is to the Northeastern United States.

Demographics

2020 census

As of the 2020 United States census, there were 5,154 people, 1,563 households, and 1,187 families residing in the CDP.

Greyhound racing in Moyock 
Local greyhound racing was originally in Norfolk County in the 1930s, until Virginia officials shut down the Cavalier Kennel Club (CKC). The CKC moved their operations a half mile south of the state line to a quarter-mile oval track in Moyock on North Carolina Highway 168. Prior to when they moved to Moyock, the CKC attracted gamblers and spectators from all over the Hampton Roads region from the late 1940s until the early 1950s. The track's primary market was the thousands of service men (mostly U.S. Navy personnel) that were stationed in Norfolk. Not long after its establishment in North Carolina, anti-gambling advocates and the North Carolina Supreme Court upheld the North Carolina State Legislature's anti-dog-racing law in 1954. It was until 2009 that the CKC was able to claim that Paul Hartwell invented the greyhound letter rating system, which stood as the standard for all greyhound racing, which also led to the Composite Speed Rating system.

NASCAR in Moyock 

After the Cavalier Kennel Club (CKC) was eliminated by the North Carolina General Assembly in the 1950s, Moyock began to host auto racing at the renamed Dog Track Speedway (DTS). Built on the former site of the CKC, the one-quarter-mile oval dirt track was then paved and lengthened to one-third of a mile in 1964. At the DTS, it hosted seven NASCAR races from 1962 until 1966. The Moyock 300 was held there from 1964–1965 in addition to the Tidewater 300 in 1965.

Ned Jarrett won the most races at the track with two wins in 1962 and 1964. Jarret's Ford raced and won all six times, totaling $4,631 in winnings. Richard Petty, a North Carolina native from Randleman, also raced there six times, driving a Plymouth in every race. Despite being on the pole twice (1965 & 1966), Petty never finished above 3rd place. His total winnings at the DTS were $1,700.

The final NASCAR race at the DTS ran on Sunday, May 29, 1966. The track was closed later in 1966 due to declining attendance, poor revenues and larger tracks being built nearby.

International business
Moyock was the corporate headquarters of Blackwater Worldwide, which was renamed Xe Services LLC, and relocated to Arlington County, Virginia, as Academi.

References

External links
 Moyock Fire Department

Census-designated places in Currituck County, North Carolina
Census-designated places in North Carolina
Blackwater (company)